The Bavarian B V (Bayerische B V) steam engines were early German  locomotives of the Royal Bavarian State Railways (Königlich Bayerische Staats-Eisenbahnen).

They were the first locomotives produced in Bavaria in large numbers — 101 in all. The first series of 14 locomotives was similar in many respects to the Class A V. The second series of 15 locomotives had Crampton boilers. The first two series were built without a steam dome on the boiler, but were later fitted with domes. The third series had steam domes on the rear section of the boiler. The fourth and last series had one at the front. All were equipped with Class 3 T 6.5 and 3 T 7 tenders.

One example — the Nordgau — is in the Nuremberg Transport Museum (Verkehrsmuseum Nürnberg). Built by Maffei in 1853, and remaining in service until 1907, it is the oldest preserved locomotive in Germany. Nordgau was sectioned lengthwise in 1925 in the main workshop at Munich, in order to provide a visual display of the operation of a steam locomotive.

See also 
 Royal Bavarian State Railways
 List of Bavarian locomotives and railbuses

External links 
 Railways of Germany forum

2-4-0 locomotives
B 05
Standard gauge locomotives of Germany
Railway locomotives introduced in 1853
1B n2 locomotives
Passenger locomotives